The following is a timeline of the history of the city of Kharkiv, Ukraine.

Prior to 20th century

 1654 - Kharkiv founded by Ukrainian Cossacks (regiment's capital of Kharkiv Regiment).
 1689 -  built.
 1734 - Kharkiv Collegium founded.
 1764 - Church of the Holy Trinity built.
 1765 - Town becomes capital of Sloboda Ukraine province.
 1777 - Assumption Cathedral built.
 1797 - Town becomes part of the Kharkov Governorate.
 1805 - Kharkiv University established.
 1817 - Population: 12,892.
 1835 - Town becomes capital of Kharkov Governorate.
 1867 - Population: 59,968.
 1868 - Railway begins operating.
 1878 - Student protest.
 1882
 Jewish Bilu group moves to Palestine.
 Population: 133,139.
 1885 - Technological Institute founded.
 1886 - Kharkiv Public Library and Museum of Art and Industry established.
 1893 - Myronosytska Church rebuilt.
 1895 - Kharkov Locomotive Factory begins operating.
 1897 - Population: 170,682.
 1900
 Revolutionary Ukrainian Party founded in city.
 Population: 197,405.

20th century

 1901 - Annunciation Cathedral consecrated.
 1903 - "People's palace" established.
 1906 - Tram begins operating.
 1913
 Choral Synagogue built.
 Population: 258,360.
 1917 - December: First All-Ukrainian Congress of Soviets (Kharkiv) held in city.
 1918 
 February: City becomes capital of Donetsk–Krivoy Rog Soviet Republic.
 April: troops loyal to the Ukrainian People's Republic take control of Kharkiv together with the German Army.
 1919 
 January: Kharkiv taken by the Red Army.
 March: Annual congress of the Communist Party of Ukraine (Soviet Union) begins in Kharkiv.
 June: Kharkiv taken by the White Army.
 December: Kharkiv retaken by the Red Army.
 1920
 City becomes capital of the Ukrainian Soviet Socialist Republic.
 Museum of History opens.
 1921
 Polish diplomatic mission established.
 Futurist Komkosmos group formed.
 1922 - City becomes part of the Union of Soviet Socialist Republics (USSR).
 1924 - Kharkov Steam Locomotive Plant housing built.
 1925 - Football Club Metalist Kharkiv formed.
 1926
 Traktor Stadium opens.
 Population: 417,342.
 1927
 Nova Generatsiia literary journal begins publication.
 Morozov Design Bureau (arms industry) established.
 1928
 Modernist Derzhprom building and Construction Workers Club built.
 Literaturnyi iarmarok journal begins publication.
 1929
 Institute of Political Education established.
 Palace of Labor, and textile workers' club built.
 1930
 International Conference of Revolutionary Writers held in city.
 National Aerospace University – Kharkiv Aviation Institute founded.
 1932
 Holodomor (famine).
 City becomes part of the Kharkiv Oblast.
 1933 - House of Trade and House of Planning Organizations and KhTZ Stadium built.
 1934
 Ukrainian SSR capital relocated from Kharkov to Kiev.
  opens.
 International Hotel built.
 Red Factory Theatre built (approximate date).
 1935
 College of Textile and Design established.
 1939 - Population: 833,432.
 1940 - April–May:  as part of the Katyn massacre.

 1941
 1,200 political prisoners burned alive by the retreating Soviets in the Kharkiv tragedy.
 20–24 October: First Battle of Kharkov; Germans in power.
 Nazi prison established by the Germans.
 1942 - 12–28 May: Second Battle of Kharkov.
 1943
 19 February-15 March: Third Battle of Kharkov.
 12–23 August: Fourth Battle of Kharkov; Soviets in power.
 1947 - Zerkalʹnaya struya (fountain) built.
 1954
 Kharkov Airport opens.
 Institute of Fire Safety established.
 1959 - Population: 934,136.
 1962 - Institute of Radioelectronics established.
 1964
 Lenin monument erected in Dzerzhinsky Square.
 Kharkiv State Academy of Culture active.
 1965 - Population: 1,070,000.
 1972 - 18 May: Airplane crash occurs near city.
 1975 - Kharkiv Metro begins operating.
 1979 - Population: 1,485,000.
 1981 - Kharkiv TV Tower erected.
 1984 - Kharkiv Metro Bridge opens.
 1985 - Population: 1,554,000.
 1988 - Museum of Literature established.
 1989
 Population: 1,609,959.
 Sister city relationship established with Cincinnati, USA.
 1990
 UkrSibbank (bank) headquartered in city.
  built.
 1991 - City becomes part of independent Ukraine.
 1995 - 1995 Kharkiv drinking water disaster.

21st century
 2001 - Population: 1,470,902.
 2002 - Roman Catholic Diocese of Kharkiv-Zaporizhia established.
 2004 - Palace of Sports "Lokomotiv" arena opens.
 2006 - 22 April: Supermarket bombings.
 2010 - Hennadiy Kernes becomes mayor.
 2012
 June: Some UEFA Euro 2012 football games played in Kharkiv.
 15 December: Beheadings
 2014
 28 April: Attempted assassination of mayor Kernes.
 Kharkiv Battalion established.
 Population: 1,451,132.

 2015 - 22 February: Bombing.
 2018 - Population: 1,430,515 (estimate).
 2021 - 21 January: Fire.
 2022 - 24 February: Battle against Putin’s gang begins.

See also
 History of Kharkiv
 Other names of Kharkiv (e.g. Charkow, Harkov, Kharkoff, Kharkow)
 List of mayors of Kharkiv

References

This article incorporates information from the Ukrainian Wikipedia and Russian Wikipedia.

Bibliography

External links

 Digital Public Library of America. Items related to Kharkiv, various dates

 
Kharkiv
Years in Ukraine